The Bibliotheca Hertziana – Max Planck Institute for Art History is a German research institute located in Rome, Italy. It was founded by a donation of Henriette Hertz in 1912 as a Kaiser Wilhelm Institute. Of the 80 institutes in the Max Planck Society (Max Planck Gesellschaft), it is one of the few not located in Germany. The institute is situated in the historical centre of Rome near Trinità dei Monti in a cluster of four buildings along the Via Gregoriana: the 16th-century Palazzo Zuccari, the adjacent Palazzo Stroganoff, the Villino Stroganoff across the road and the new library building (completed in 2012) designed by the Spanish architect Juan Navarro Baldeweg.

Purpose/Activities 
The Bibliotheca Hertziana was founded in 1913 in Rome as an institute of the Kaiser-Wilhelm-Society for research on Italian art from the period immediately following antiquity, and in particular the Renaissance and the Baroque periods. These two epochs take centre stage in the research to date and soon will be joined by a third focus, the art of the Italian Middle Ages. The programme of the Hertziana focuses on the art of Rome as well as that of central and southern Italy, as they were the cradle of important developments that affected European art history as a whole. Last but not least, Roman art owes its status to Roman artists' permanent confrontation with ancient art in all its forms—an interaction that is unavoidable in Rome. The institute supports the following projects:
 ArsRoma – science database for art history about painting in Rome 1580-1630;
 Epistemic history of architecture;
 Lineamenta – a database for the study of architectural drawings;
 CIPRO - Maps of Rome online;
 Minerva Research Group: Roma communis patria - The National Churches in Rome from the Middle Ages to the Modern Era
 Italy in China

Regular workshops on current projects, monthly lectures, study courses for younger academics from the German-speaking countries as well as numerous symposia and congresses provide opportunities for academic exchange between the members of the institute and guests from outside. The Bibliotheca Hertziana's holdings of specialist literature as well as its collection of more than 800.000 photographs of historical assets, with its focus on the history of Italian art from the Middle Ages to modern times, are accessible online via the institute's online catalogues. Since 1990, the Bibliotheca Hertziana has awarded the Hanno and Ilse Hahn Prize every second year for outstanding merit in the field of Italian art and architectural history. The prize is named after the only son and daughter-in-law of the late president of the Max-Planck-Gesellschaft Otto Hahn, who were killed in an accident in France in 1960.

Periodical Publications 
 Römisches Jahrbuch
 Römische Forschungen
 Römische Studien
 Studi della Bibliotheca Hertziana
 Publications outside the series and in collaboration with other institutions
 Electronic Publications

Further reading 
 100 Jahre Bibliotheca Hertziana. Band 1: Die Geschichte des Instituts 1913–2013 (with English summaries); Band 2: Der Palazzo Zuccari und die Institutsgebäude 1590–2013. Hirmer Verlag, München 2013,  / .
 Thomas Adam, Transnational Philanthropy: the Mond Family's Support for Public Institutions in Western Europe from 1890 to 1938, New York 2016.

References

External links 
 Homepage of the Bibliotheca Hertziana - Max Planck Institute of Art History

Libraries in Rome
Max Planck Institutes
History organisations based in Italy
History institutes
1913 establishments in Italy
Rome R. IV Campo Marzio
Libraries established in the 1910s